Severovýchod (Northeast) is a statistical area of the Nomenclature of Territorial Units for Statistics, level 2 NUTS. It is composed of the Liberec Region, Hradec Králové Region and Pardubice Region of the Czech Republic. It covers an area of 12,440 km2, with 1,507,209 inhabitants and a (population density of 119 inhabitants/km2).

Economy 
The Gross domestic product (GDP) of the region was 24.7 billion € in 2018, accounting for 11.9% of Czech economic output. GDP per capita adjusted for purchasing power was 23,000 € or 76% of the EU27 average in the same year. The GDP per employee was also 74% of the EU average.

See also
NUTS of the Czech Republic

References

NUTS 2 statistical regions of the European Union
Subdivisions of the Czech Republic